Laholms tidning is a Swedish newspaper that was published six days a week from Laholm, Sweden. In 2018 it filed for bankruptcy. In 2019 Bonnier News bought the remnants. It is, as of 2021, an online section of Helsingborgs Dagblad as well as a free weekly paper newspaper

History and profile
Laholms tidning was first published on 5 December 1931, originally printed every second day. The paper was bought by the farmers movement in 1932. It has had extensive collaborations with Hallands Nyheter, due shared background in the farmers movement.

References

External links
Official website

1931 establishments in Sweden
Daily newspapers published in Sweden
Publications established in 1931
Swedish-language newspapers